Chimboya or Chimbolla (possibly from Aymara Chimpuya, Chimpulla), Inchurusi (Jinchurusi), Iruna or Vilcanota (Willkanuta) is a mountain in the La Raya mountain range in the Andes of Peru, about  high. It is situated in the Cusco Region, Canas Province, Layo District and in the Puno Region, Melgar Province, Santa Rosa District. Chimboya lies northeast of the La Raya Pass and the mountain Kunka and southeast of the mountain Yana Khuchilla.

Images

References

Mountains of Peru
Mountains of Cusco Region
Mountains of Puno Region